Redvers Airport  was located  northeast of Redvers, Saskatchewan, Canada. The airport, previously operated by the RM of Antler #61, was abandoned as of February 16, 2006.

See also 
 List of airports in Saskatchewan
 List of defunct airports in Canada

References 

Antler No. 61, Saskatchewan
Defunct airports in Saskatchewan